Events from the year 1700 in the Kingdom of Scotland.

Incumbents 
 Monarch – William II
 Secretary of State – James Ogilvy, 1st Earl of Seafield, jointly with John Carmichael, 1st Earl of Hyndford

Law officers 
 Lord Advocate – Sir James Stewart
 Solicitor General for Scotland – Sir Patrick Hume

Judiciary 
 Lord President of the Court of Session – Lord North Berwick 
 Lord Justice General – Lord Lothian
 Lord Justice Clerk – Lord Pollok

Events 
 5 January – Moffat schoolteacher Robert Carmichael is scourged through the streets of Edinburgh and banished for killing a pupil during punishment for misbehaviour.
 3 February – "Lesser Great Fire" around Parliament Close, Edinburgh, leaves 400 families homeless.
 30 March – second Darien expedition abandoned.

 19 April – Campbeltown is erected a royal burgh.
 Approximate date about which the independent pro-Union group later known as the Squadrone Volante forms around John Hay, 2nd Marquess of Tweeddale.
 Possible approximate date at which the last wolf in Scotland is shot, north of Brora in Sutherland.
 Scottish American settler Isaac Magoon establishes the town of Scotland, Connecticut.

Births 
 April – John Kennedy, 8th Earl of Cassilis (died 1759)
 27 August – Charles Colyear, 2nd Earl of Portmore (died 1785)
 11 September – James Thomson, poet (died 1748)

Full date unknown 
 George Bogle of Daldowie, tobacco and sugar merchant and Rector of the University of Glasgow (died 1784)
 Donald Cameron of Lochiel (died 1748)
 George Gilmer Sr., politician (died 1757)

Deaths 
 March – Andrew Bruce, bishop (year of birth unknown)
 29 July – Prince William, Duke of Gloucester heir to the thrones of England, Scotland and Ireland (born 1689)
 16 November – Jamie Macpherson, outlaw (born 1675)

The arts
 An edition of the late 16th-century Scots poet Alexander Montgomerie's The Cherrie and the Slae is printed in Ulster.

See also 
 Timeline of Scottish history

References 

 
Years of the 17th century in Scotland